Buckhaven railway station served the town of Buckhaven, Fife, Scotland, from 1881 to 1964 on the Wemyss and Buckhaven Railway.

History 
The station was opened on 8 August 1881 by the Wemyss and Buckhaven Railway. To the west was the goods yard and to the north was its sidings. To the north of this was Buckhaven Saw Mills. The station closed to passengers on 10 January 1955 and closed to goods on 28 December 1964.

References 

Disused railway stations in Fife
Railway stations in Great Britain opened in 1881
Railway stations in Great Britain closed in 1955
1881 establishments in Scotland
1964 disestablishments in Scotland
Levenmouth